Veettukulle Thiruvizha is a 1996 Indian Tamil language romantic comedy film directed by K. R. S. Jawahar. The film stars Anand Babu, Sanghavi, Rohini and Vinodhini, with R. Sundarrajan, Vadivukkarasi, Vijaya Chandrika, Jai Ganesh, Kumarimuthu, K. K. Soundar and Pandu playing supporting roles. It was released on 30 December 1996.

Plot
Muthuvel is the son of Ramasamy and Parvathi. Ramasamy wants his son to marry his niece Abhirami while Parvathi wants him to marry her niece Krishnaveni. After finishing his studies in the city, Muthuvel returns to his home. Therefore, Abhirami with her parents and Krishnaveni with her parents enter his home to seduce him. One day, Muthuvel's college lover Gayathri comes to his home and she hugs Muthuvel thus shocking his family.

Muthuvel and Gayathri are in love and they want to get married at any cost. Abhirami and Krishnaveni who were fighting for Muthuvel all along join hands against Gayathri. In the meantime, Muthuvel's little sister becomes pregnant and she reveals that the father is her collegemate Kumaresan. Gounder, Kumaresan's father, is not willing to give his son in marriage but later, he accepts if Muthuvel is ready to marry his daughter Lakshmi. Gayathri then sacrifices her love by orchestrating a fake drama portraying her as a bad person. Meanwhile, Abhirami's parents and Krishnaveni parents don't want their daughter to marry anymore Muthuvel and they all leave his house. When Muthuvel learns about the fake drama, he embarks on a search for his lover. The film ends with Muthuvel and Gayathri embracing.

Cast

Anand Babu as Muthuvel
Sanghavi as Abhirami
Rohini as Gayathri
Vinodhini as Krishnaveni
R. Sundarrajan as Ramasamy
Vadivukkarasi as Parvathi
Vijaya Chandrika as Rasathi
Jai Ganesh as Kathavarayan
Kumarimuthu as Rajasekhar
K. K. Soundar as Gounder
Pandu as Meganathan
Rajkanth
Sheela
Ramya
Jayadevi
Idichapuli Selvaraj as Tirumangalam
Vishnu
Veeramani
Thideer Kannaiah as Kannaiah
Kovai Senthil as Marriage broker
Tharani
Anuja in a special appearance

Soundtrack
The music was composed by Deva, with lyrics written by Vaali and Ponniyin Selvan.

References

1996 films
1990s Tamil-language films
Indian romantic comedy films
Films scored by Deva (composer)
1996 directorial debut films
1996 romantic comedy films